Hesperilla sexguttata, also known as the riverine sedge-skipper or six-spot skipper, is a species of butterfly in the family Hesperiidae. It is found in Australia in the Northern Territory, Queensland and Western Australia.

The wingspan is about 25 mm.

The larvae feed on Cyperus decompositus, Cyperus javanicus and Cyperus microcephalus. They create a shelter by curling leaves of their host and holding them with silk. They hide in this shelter during the day and emerge to feed nocturnally. Pupation takes place inside this shelter.

External links
Australian Insects
Australian Faunal Directory

Trapezitinae
Butterflies described in 1869
Butterflies of Australia
Taxa named by Gottlieb August Wilhelm Herrich-Schäffer